Lake Bujon National Park lies in the Hamgyong Mountains of northern South Hamgyong Province of North Korea at an altitude of 900–1190 m above sea level.  It is a 2600 ha site comprising the freshwater Lake Bujon and adjacent coniferous forest.  It has been identified by BirdLife International as an Important Bird Area (IBA) because it supports a significant population of vulnerable great bustards.

References

Important Bird Areas of North Korea
Bujon
Nature conservation in North Korea
South Hamgyong